A sanctuary campus is any college or university, typically in North America and Western Europe, that adopts policies to protect members of the campus community who are undocumented immigrants. The term is modeled after "sanctuary city", a status that has been adopted by over 30 municipalities. Proposed policies on sanctuary campuses include:
 Not allowing Immigration and Customs Enforcement (ICE) officers onto campus without a warrant.
 The refusal of campus police to enforce immigration law.
 Not sharing student immigration status with ICE.
 Not gathering information on immigration or citizenship status.
 Providing tuition support, including in-state tuition rates at public universities to students with DACA status.
 Providing distance-learning options for deported students to complete their degrees.
 Providing confidential legal support to students with immigration law questions and issues.
 Expanding policies to include medical and other facilities associated with the campus.
 Reducing the deployment of campus police to protests that seek to include undocumented students and workers to avoid intimidation of undocumented activists.
 Ending practices which undermine worker and student worker labor unions.
The American Association of University Professors endorsed the sanctuary campus movement on November 22, 2016, and urged colleges and universities to adopt sanctuary policies.

Background 
An estimated 200,000 to 225,000 college students in the United States are undocumented, according to the Pew Research Center. Approximately 49% of illegal immigrants between 18 and 24 have attended college or university, compared with 71% of all US residents in this age group.

Protests and campaigns 

In November 2016, students around the country staged demonstrations, walk-outs, and sit-ins in an effort to push their schools to declare themselves a "sanctuary campus" from President-elect Donald Trump's planned immigration policy of mass deportations. The Stanford, Rutgers, and St. Mary's protests on November 15, 2016 were among the first. Universities and colleges with protest activity in support of sanctuary campuses include:
 Connecticut College
 Dartmouth College
 Drexel University
Florida State University
 Hobart and William Smith Colleges
 Middlebury College
 Mills College
 New Mexico State University
 The New School
Northeastern University
 Ohio University
 Portland Community College
 Rutgers University
 St. Mary's College
 Stanford University
 Stockton University
 Texas State University
 Texas Womans University
 Trinity College
 Tufts University
 University of Denver
 University of Illinois campuses
 University of Michigan
 University of Mississippi
 University of New Mexico
 University of North Texas
 University of Pennsylvania
 University of San Diego
 Vanderbilt University
 Wesleyan University
 Western New Mexico University
 Yale University<ref
 name=":2" />

School policies 
In the wake of protests and petitions, at least eight colleges and universities have declared themselves sanctuary campuses, and many more have outlined policies and procedures that protect illegal immigrant students and others threatened with registration or deportation.

Self-declared sanctuaries 
Portland State University and Reed College presidents were the first institutions in the country to officially declare their campuses as sanctuaries.

Public declarations of protective policies 
Rutgers president Robert Barchi responded that the school will protect the privacy of its illegal immigrants. California State University chancellor Timothy P. White made a similar affirmation. Iowa State University reaffirmed continuation of their already existing policy. Haverford College passed a resolution at the Fall 2022 Plenary (a biannual gathering of 2/3 of the student body that effectively creates policy for the college) that establishes Haverford as a sanctuary campus following their 2016 announcement of similar policies. Haverford's resolution will become official once signed by President Wendy Raymond.

California Senate Bill 54 (California Values Act) 

California Senate Bill 54 was introduced by California senator Kevin de León. The bill requires that California, very much like a sanctuary city, vastly limit its law enforcement agencies from working alongside federal immigration agencies, as well as prohibit them from using their resources to detain and investigate people amongst other regulations, on the basis of immigration purposes. California law enforcement agencies will no longer be able to transfer a person or release information regarding their criminal history to federal immigration agencies without an existing judicial warrant. In addition to that, local and state law enforcement agencies will also be required to release the names of inmates/parolees to federal immigration agencies 60 days prior to them being released from jail if they are or were convicted for a violent crime. If a California law enforcement agency and federal immigration agency work in joint efforts, the California law enforcement agency cannot take on the role of an immigration agency. Not only that but as of January 1, 2009 it will have to create a biyearly report about the frequency of the joint efforts and information exchanged, and that all would have to be posted in the Attorney General's website. The bill has been voted on by the California Senate. According to CNN, it resulted in a 27–12 lead with Democrats being the dominant supporters. Despite the support from the California senate, the bill still faces opposition from groups such as the California State Sheriff Association, that feels like it too tightly limits their ability to carry out their job.

The California public schools this bill will directly affect are any k-12 school under local governing or charter school boards, the California Community College, and the California State University branch. Under this bill the security, police agencies, and staff working for them will be limited to no longer inquire information regarding a person's legal status, release private information that is not yet available to the public, or detain and question amongst other things on the basis of aiding an immigration enforcement agency/investigation. In order for this to take place, three months after the bill is approved, the General Attorney would need to publish a policy with the regulations and limitations that the public schools will need to enact in order to guarantee confidentiality to the students in regards to not releasing their information to immigration authorities. Not only that, but the policy will include regulations that won't allow for immigration agencies to work in the campus or have individuals transferred to them unless a judicial warrant is present. The public schools are expected to follow the policy, or create their own that is up to par with the one created by the Attorney General. Since the state will be imposing new regulations on public schools, they are up for reimbursement for the money they spend implementing them. That is because under California Constitution, a school district/campus is eligible for reimbursement if it had to create a new space in its budget to carry out its mandate. According to the LA Times, even though the University of California is not one of the California public school obligated to implement this bill if passed, it is encouraged to adopt its policies because it is a government organization that provides education and social services among other things to the residents of California.

Europe 

In 2017, Athlone Institute of Technology became the first designated college of sanctuary in Ireland.

City of Sanctuary UK recognises certain universities as Universities of Sanctuary. The first Universities of Sanctuary were the University of Edinburgh and University of Warwick in 2017. One of the first University Colleges of Sanctuary was Somerville College, Oxford in 2021.

References 

Illegal immigration to the United States
Safe houses